The elm cultivar Ulmus 'Marmorata' was identified by Dieck, Zöschen, Germany in Haupt-catalog der Obst- und gehölzbaumschulen des ritterguts Zöschen bei Merseburg 1885 as Ulmus campestris marmorata. Considered "probably U. carpinifolia" (: minor) by Green.

Description
'Marmorata' was described as "beautifully variegated with white"; the original tree in Destedter Park, Cremlingen, Lower Saxony, was said to have produced massive variegated suckers.

Cultivation
No specimens are known to survive.

Synonymy
?Ulmus campestris f. fol. argento-marmoratis: Dippel, Illustriertes Handbuch der Laubholzkunde, 2:25, 1892.

References

External links

Ulmus articles missing images
Ulmus
Missing elm cultivars